The Standard Gravure shooting occurred on September 14, 1989, in Louisville, Kentucky, when Joseph T. Wesbecker, a 47-year-old pressman, killed eight people and injured twelve at his former workplace, Standard Gravure, before committing suicide. The shooting is the deadliest mass shooting in Kentucky's history. The murders resulted in a high-profile lawsuit against Eli Lilly and Company, manufacturers of the antidepressant drug Prozac, which Wesbecker had begun taking during the month prior to his shooting rampage.

The shooting
On September 14, 1989, Wesbecker, who was nicknamed "Rocky" by his colleagues, parked his car in front of the main entrance of Standard Gravure and entered the plant at 8:38 a.m., carrying a Polytech AK-47S, (a Chinese-made semiautomatic AK-47 derivative), a SIG Sauer P226 9mm pistol, and a duffel bag containing two MAC-11s, a snubnosed .38 caliber Smith & Wesson Model 12 Airweight revolver, a bayonet, and several hundred rounds of ammunition.

He took the elevator to the executive reception area on the third floor and, as soon as the doors opened, he fired at receptionists Sharon Needy, whom he killed, and Angela Bowman, who he paralyzed with a shot in the back. Searching for Standard Gravure's President, Michael Shea, and other supervisors and managers of the plant, Wesbecker calmly walked through the hallways, deliberately shooting at people. He killed James Husband and injured Forrest Conrad, Paula Warman and John Stein, a bindery supervisor whom he shot in the head and abdomen. Wesbecker then headed down the stairs to the pressroom, where he killed Paul Sallee and wounded Stanley Hatfield and David Sadenfaden, two electricians from Marine Electric who were working on a broken machine.

Leaving his duffel bag under a stairwell, Wesbecker walked down to the basement, where he encountered pressman John Tingle who, alerted by the loud noises, went to see what was going on. Tingle greeted his colleague, asking him what was happening. Wesbecker replied: "Hi John... I told them I'd be back. Get away from me." After Tingle moved out of his way, Wesbecker continued his path through the basement, shooting Richard Barger in the back, killing him. According to witnesses, Wesbecker approached Barger's body and apologized, having apparently killed him accidentally, as he could not see at whom he was shooting.

Back on the pressroom floor, he shot at anyone in his way, killing James Wible and Lloyd White, then finally entered the breakroom, where he emptied his magazine, hitting all seven workers present and killing William Ganote with a shot to the head. Wesbecker then reloaded and resumed firing, fatally wounding Kenneth Fentress.

Wesbecker then returned to the pressroom, where he pulled out his SIG Sauer, put it under his chin, and shot himself, ending a shooting spree that had lasted for about half an hour. He had fired about 40 rounds, leaving eight people dead and twelve wounded. One person had suffered a heart attack.

When police searched Wesbecker's house, they recovered a shotgun, a Colt 9-millimeter revolver, a .32 revolver, and a starter's pistol. They found Wesbecker's will, as well as an issue of Time Magazine on the kitchen table. The magazine featured an article about Patrick Purdy, who had killed five children and injured 32 others with a Type 56 assault rifle (essentially the same weapon Wesbecker used) at a school in Stockton, California earlier that year.

Victims

Standard Gravure
Standard Gravure was a prominent printing company founded in 1922 by Barry Bingham Sr. Reduced revenues led to an employee wage freeze in 1982, and in 1986 the Bingham family sold the company. Standard Gravure's customers were retailers, many of which were in the process of going out of business, and at the same time, paper shortages were occurring in the marketplace.

Perpetrator

Joseph Thomas Wesbecker (April 27, 1942 – September 14, 1989) was identified as the shooter. When he was 13 months old, his father, a construction worker, died in a fall. After his father's death, he was raised as an only child by his mother Martha, herself only 16 years old at that time, and her family, though he was often passed from place to place during his early childhood, and at one time deposited in an orphanage for almost a year. His grandfather, to whom he felt closely attached, died when he was four.

As Wesbecker was a poor student he dropped out of high school in the ninth grade, but he later managed to earn his G.E.D. In 1960 he started to work as a pressman at a printing plant and married one year later. With his wife he had two sons, James and Joseph. In 1971, he started working at Standard Gravure, where he soon earned a reputation as a determined, hard-working, loyal and reliable worker.

The year 1978 marked the beginning of the downward slope of Wesbecker's life. His marriage ended in divorce and a bitter battle over custody and support for his two sons ensued. It was also the year he admitted himself for the first time to a hospital to seek psychiatric treatment. In 1983, Wesbecker married again; Wesbecker's second marriage also ended in divorce after one year. As a consequence he became increasingly reclusive and suicidal, separated from most of his family members and lived an overall lonely life, in whose center his work remained.

After the selling of Standard Gravure and the subsequent management change in 1986, Wesbecker was assigned to a mechanical folder. He soon complained about stress and undue pressure and asked to be placed back at his old job. His request was declined, and he grew increasingly hostile against the new management, became wary of conspiracies aimed to harass him, and began to complain about policy changes at the company. He started complaining that exposure to toluene at work caused him memory loss, dizziness and "blackout spells".

The hostility culminated in May 1987, when Wesbecker filed a complaint with the Jefferson County Human Relations Commission, charging that he was being harassed and discriminated against for his psychological state and being deliberately put under stressful conditions. A subsequent examination confirmed that Wesbecker suffered from depression and manic depression, substantiating his claim of mental illness. He was prescribed Prozac.

In August 1988, Wesbecker stopped working and was finally put on a long-term disability leave in February 1989, though there was also an agreement to re-employ him as soon as he recovered sufficiently. Between August 1988 and May 1989 Wesbecker bought several weapons, among them the AK-47 and pistol he later used in the shooting. Shortly before the shooting at Standard Gravure, where he showed up the last time on September 13, Wesbecker presumably received a letter from the company, announcing the cancellation of his disability income.

Psychiatric history
Wesbecker had a long history of psychiatric illness and was treated for it in hospitals at least three times between 1978 and 1987. He was diagnosed as suffering from alternating episodes of deep depression and manic depression, was beset, among others, by confusion, anger and anxiety and made several attempts to commit suicide. Hospital records also suggested that Wesbecker posed a threat to himself and others.

According to CBS's 60 Minutes, "In 1984, five years before he took Prozac, Wesbecker's medical records show that he had this conversation with a doctor. Have you ever felt like harming someone else? 'Yes,' Wesbecker said. Who? 'My foreman.' When? 'At work.' The same medical records show Wesbecker had already attempted suicide 12 to 15 times."

In the years prior to the shooting Wesbecker more than once threatened to "kill a bunch of people" or to bomb Standard Gravure and at one point considered hiring an assassin to kill several executives of the company. Apparently he even discussed these things with his wife before their divorce. When he left Standard Gravure in August 1988 he told other workers that he would come back, wipe out the place and get even with the company and shortly before the shooting he told one of his aunts that he was upset about things at work and said they will get paid back, but as he said these things all the time, she didn't take the threat too seriously.

One of the employees at Standard Gravure said after the shooting: "This guy's been talking about this for a year. He's been talking about guns and Soldier of Fortune magazine. He's paranoid, and he thought everyone was after him."

Three days prior to the shooting, on September 11, Wesbecker told his psychiatrist that a foreman had forced Wesbecker to perform oral sex on him in front of his co-workers to get off the folder. In his notes, the psychiatrist wrote "Prozac?"

Wesbecker is buried in Louisville's Cave Hill Cemetery.

Lawsuit
In August 1989, less than a month before the shooting, Wesbecker had started taking Prozac. The wounded and the families of those killed filed a lawsuit against the drug's manufacturer, Eli Lilly and Company, claiming that Wesbecker's use of Prozac contributed to his actions. The case went to jury trial. Midway through, defense testimony opened a door that would have allowed plaintiffs to make known to the jury Lilly's 1985 conviction for failing to report to the federal Food and Drug Administration adverse reactions to Oraflex, another Lilly drug. The plaintiffs and Lilly then negotiated an agreement, which they concealed from the trial judge, John W. Potter. The trial continued, and plaintiffs never introduced the precedent of Lilly's conduct with respect to Oraflex. The jury decided in Lilly's favor, and when plaintiffs failed to appeal, a suspecting Judge Potter uncovered the concealed agreement. With unanimous authorization from Kentucky's Supreme Court, he succeeded in amending the court record to show that the case was resolved by settlement rather than jury verdict.

References

External links
 Photo of Wesbecker's grave
 Gunman made threats over the past 20 years, The Deseret News (September 15, 1989)
 Disgruntled employee kills seven, wounds 13, takes own life, Mohave Daily Miner (September 15, 1989)
 In Killer's Disorder, Cycles Of Elation and Depression, The New York Times (September 16, 1989)
 Peck, Dennis L. & Dolch, Norman Allan: Extraordinary Behavior

1989 in Kentucky
1989 mass shootings in the United States
1989 murders in the United States
Attacks in the United States in 1989
Crimes in Louisville, Kentucky
Deaths by firearm in Kentucky
Eli Lilly and Company
Murder–suicides in Kentucky
Mass murder in 1989
Mass shootings in Kentucky
Mass shootings in the United States
Murder in Kentucky
September 1989 events in the United States
Workplace violence in the United States